OTRAG (or ), was a German company based in Stuttgart, which in the late 1970s and early 1980s planned to develop an alternative propulsion system for rockets. OTRAG was the first commercial developer and producer of space launch vehicles. The OTRAG Rocket claimed to present an inexpensive alternative to existing launch systems through mass-production of Common Rocket Propulsion Units (CRPU).

History
OTRAG was founded on October 17, 1974 by the German aerospace engineer Lutz Kayser. OTRAG's goal was to develop, produce, and operate a low-cost satellite launch vehicle. It was the first private company to attempt to launch a private spacecraft. The OTRAG rocket was intended to be an inexpensive alternative to the European rocket Ariane and the NASA Space Shuttle. Kayser and a private consortium of six hundred European investors financed the development and production of the OTRAG satellite launch vehicle. Dr. Kurt H. Debus served as Chairman of the Board of OTRAG (1974–1980) after his retirement as director of NASA's Kennedy Space Center, and Dr. Wernher von Braun served as scientific adviser to Kayser.

In the face of doubts by Debus and von Braun, Kayser chose in 1975 to set up testing and launch facilities in Shaba, Zaire (now Katanga Province in the Democratic Republic of the Congo). Debus and von Braun were concerned about the possibility of Zairian acquisition of missile technology from the facilities. Kayser decided to proceed despite their opposition.

Otrag's first test was on May 17, 1977, with the second successful launch on May 20, 1978. The third test failed on June 5, with Zairian President Mobutu Sese Seko watching the launch.

Political pressure to halt the company's operations mounted quickly. France and the Soviet Union were historically opposed to German long-distance rocket development, and pressured the Zairian government into closing down the development facility in 1979. Immediately afterwards, Presidents Giscard d'Estaing of France and Leonid Brezhnev of the Soviet Union convinced the West German government to cancel the OTRAG project and close down its German operations. In 1980, OTRAG moved its production and testing facilities to a desert site in Libya. A series of successful tests were conducted at this site beginning in 1981.

OTRAG shut down in 1987. As the company left Libya, Muammar Gaddafi confiscated all equipment and installations, hoping to later use the technology, and German investors lost their money.

Rocket design

OTRAG was a design quite different from conventional multistage rockets. The OTRAG design used parallel stages assembled from parallel tank tubes with flat bulkheads. The rockets were designed to carry loads up to two tons, the then usual weight of a communications satellite, into a geostationary orbit. It was planned to later increase the capacity to ten tons or more using multiple identical modules.

The rocket was to consist of individual pipes, each 27 cm in diameter and six meters long. Four of these pipes would be installed one above the other resulting in a 24 meter long fuel and oxidizer tank with a rocket engine at the lower end making up a CRPU. The fuel was intended to be kerosene with a 50/50 mixture of nitric acid and dinitrogen tetroxide as an oxidiser. Ignition was provided by a small quantity of furfuryl alcohol injected before the fuel, which ignites hypergolically (immediately and energetically) upon contact with the nitric acid. To simplify the design, pumps were not used to move the fuel to the engines, instead the fuel tanks were only 66% filled, with compressed air in the remaining space to press propellants into the ablatively cooled combustion chamber. Thrust control is by partially closing the electromechanical propellant valves. Pitch and yaw control can thus be achieved by differential throttling. In principle this is extremely reliable and cheap in mass production.

The modular design was intended to result in a large cost reduction due to economies of scale. The CRPU-based satellite launching rocket was estimated to cost approximately one tenth of conventional designs. Automated production processes for all components would reduce labor cost from 80% to 20% and remove the justification for reusability of spent stages.

One large 4 stage configuration OTRAG 10K was supposed to launch a payload of 10,000 kg to a 185 km Orbit. The planned liftoff thrust was around 26 MN with a total mass of 2,300 tonnes:
 stage 1 : 456 CRPU
 stage 2 : 114 CRPU
 stage 3 : 48 CRPU
 stage 4 : 7 CRPU

Controversies and future outlook
Only a few political controversies are known concerning OTRAG, which involve the concerns of neighbors in Zaire and Libya about the dual use potential of rockets. A full orbital launch vehicle was never assembled. Modules were flight tested in Zaire and Libya. 6,000 static rocket engine tests and 16 single-stage qualification tests were made to prove the concept as feasible .

Hans Dietrich Genscher, the then-minister of German foreign affairs, is said to have finally stopped the project under pressure from France and the Soviet Union, and West Germany joined the co-financed "European rocket" Ariane project, which made the OTRAG project unnecessary and eliminated political entanglements of a still divided Germany in the early 1980s.

Around 2009, Lutz Kayser had been advising Interorbital Systems, resulting in a similar modular rocket design for their Neptune series.

John Carmack, founder and lead engineer of Armadillo Aerospace has stated in his monthly reports and in forum posts that he expected his path to an orbital vehicle to include modular rockets similar to OTRAG technology. Kayser, being the founding engineer of OTRAG, visited Armadillo in May, 2006 and loaned Carmack some of their original research hardware.

"I have been corresponding with Lutz [Kayser] for a few months now, and I have learned quite a few things. I seriously considered an OTRAG style massive-cluster-of-cheap-modules orbital design back when we had 98% peroxide (assumed to be a biprop with kerosene), and I have always considered it one of the viable routes to significant reduction in orbital launch costs. After really going over the trades and details with Lutz, I am quite convinced that this is the lowest development cost route to significant orbital capability. Eventually, reusable stages will take over, but I actually think that we can make it all the way to orbit on our current budget by following this path. The individual modules are less complicated than our current vehicles, and I am becoming more and more fond of high production methods over hand crafter prototypes." -- Carmack June 2006 Armadillo Aerospace Update

See also
 Pressure-fed engine (rocket)
 ARCAspace

References

External links

 B14643.de
 Article about the OTRAG history (de)
 Astronautix.com OTRAG 2001 inc 
 Documentary "Fly Rocket Fly" (B/D, 90 Min, 2018): www.otrag.com 

Companies based in Stuttgart
Rocketry
Private spaceflight companies
Aerospace companies of Germany
Defunct spaceflight companies
German companies established in 1975